Oxychilus yartanicus is a species of air-breathing land snail, a terrestrial pulmonate gastropod mollusk in the family Oxychilidae, the glass snails.

Distribution
This species occurs in Majorca.

References

External links 

Oxychilus
Gastropods described in 2007
Endemic fauna of the Balearic Islands